P. J. Delaney (born 1973) is an Irish retired hurler who played as a full-forward for the Kilkenny senior team. He joined the team during the 1993 championship and became a regular member of the starting fifteen.

Delaney won one All-Ireland winners' medal, two Leinster winners' medals and one National League winners' medal. He was an All-Ireland runner-up on two occasions. Delaney's career came to an abrupt end following an attack after the 1999 championship.

At club level Delaney played with Fenians.

Delaney is a member of an extended hurling-playing family. His father, Pat Delaney, won four All-Ireland medals, while his uncles, Billy Fitzpatrick and Shem Delaney, won six All-Ireland medals between them throughout the 1970s and 1980s. His first cousin, J. J. Delaney, was a member of the Kilkenny team and won six All-Ireland medals, while another cousin, also P. J. Delaney, joined the Kilkenny senior team in 2006.

References

1973 births
Living people
Fenians hurlers
Kilkenny inter-county hurlers
Leinster inter-provincial hurlers
All-Ireland Senior Hurling Championship winners